Adriana Cisneros Phelps de Griffin (born 17 December 1979) is a Venezuelan businesswoman, and the CEO of Grupo Cisneros, a privately-owned media, entertainment, digital media, real estate, tourism resorts, and consumer products company. She is also president of the Fundación Cisneros.

Early life and education 
Cisneros was born in Caracas, Venezuela, to Gustavo Cisneros and Patricia Phelps de Cisneros. Cisneros' paternal grandfather was Diego Cisneros, who founded Grupo Cisneros. Her maternal grandfather was William H. Phelps, Jr. Her maternal great-grandfather was William H. Phelps, Sr., who, in 1953, started the first television station in Venezuela. Both were noted businessmen and ornithologists. She has an older brother, Guillermo Cisneros, and an older sister, Carolina Cisneros de Rodríguez.

In 1998, she graduated from Deerfield Academy, a boarding school in Deerfield, Massachusetts, she attended along with other family members.

In 2002, Cisneros received a bachelor's degree from Columbia University. In 2005 she received a master's degree in journalism from New York University. In 2010, Cisneros attended Harvard Business School's Program for Leadership Development.

Career 
Cisneros worked at the organization, Aid for AIDS, which promotes awareness and treatment of AIDS in Latin America.

Grupo Cisneros 
Grupo Cisneros is one of the largest privately held media entertainment organizations in the world.

From 2009 to August 2013, Cisneros was Vice Chairman and Director of Strategy at Grupo Cisneros. In this position, for five years Cisneros worked with her father and then CEO, Steven Bandel, to create a transition plan. In 2013, at the age of 33, Cisneros was appointed CEO of Grupo Cisneros, taking over from Bandel.

Cisneros is the third generation of her family to lead Grupo Cisneros. Her paternal grandfather, Diego Cisneros, was the organization’s founder, and she is the daughter of its former Chairman, Gustavo Cisneros and Patricia Phelps de Cisneros.

In the six months before Cisneros became CEO in 2013, Cisneros reorganized the company into three divisions. The three divisions are: Cisneros Media, Cisneros Interactive, Cisneros Real Estate. Cisneros Media was the legacy business, while Cisneros Interactive and Cisneros Real Estate were business units that she created from scratch.
 Cisneros Media: Includes the Venezuelan TV Channel, Venevisión, as well as cable TV channels Venevision Plus, VmasTV and VePlusTV. Cisneros is the owner of the Miss Venezuela Organization, which holds a record six Miss World and seven Miss Universe titles. Besides it includes the corporate enterprises as Cisneros Media Distribution; Venevision Productions; the record labels VeneMusic and Siente Music and the concert producer and promoter VeneShow
 Cisneros Interactive: Digital media division created on 2011, focused on digital and mobile publicity, e-commerce, social games and crowd-founding. It includes RedMas and Adsmovil companies, besides investment enterprises as Cuponidad, Mobly, Idea.me and Queremos
 Cisneros Real Estate: Real Estate division which includes Tropicalia, a sustainable tourism development located in Dominican Republic

Cisneros has said that she built upon approaches used first by her grandfather, Diego Cisneros, and later perfected by her father, Gustavo Cisneros, to establish pan-regional business relationships. An example of her father's work to distribute risk and innovate across the region was his roll-out of DirecTV Latin America in the 1990s. Corporate social responsibility is an integral part of decision-making, as Cisneros sees it as being good business to focus on responsible and strategic members within the communities they operate.

Cisneros has been instrumental in establishing a nimble approach to business for Cisneros. She uses a small team of generalist finance and legal specialists to work on long-term goals, acquisitions, and planning.

Cisneros Interactive focuses on monetizing digital traffic with a pan-regional approach to extending their ad network. In November 2016, Cisneros Interactive started a partnership with Facebook Latin America to be its exclusive reseller in Latin American countries including Venezuela, Paraguay, Ecuador and Bolivia.

Fundación Cisneros
Cisneros has served as the President of the Fundación Cisneros, a non-profit organization founded by her parents, Gustavo Cisneros and Patricia Phelps de Cisneros, that strives to improve education in Latin America and foster global awareness of the region’s heritage and its contribution to world culture. She also oversaw the foundation’s educational initiatives, including the teacher training program, Actualización de Maestros en Educación (AME).

Personal life 
In 2007, Cisneros married British novelist, Nicholas Griffin. They have two children, and live in Miami, Florida.

Leadership 
 AST & Science, Board Member
 Citibank Private Bank Latin American Advisory Board, Member
 Council on Foreign Relations, Term Member
 Endeavor Miami, Co-Chair and Board Member
 International Academy of Television Arts & Sciences' International Emmys, Director and Executive Board Member
 Museum of Modern Art, International Council and Latin American and Caribbean Fund
 MoMA PS1, Board Member
 Paley Center for Media, Trustee
 The Aspen Institute. Henry Crown Fellowship
 John S. and James L. Knight Foundation, trustee
 Wyncode, Advisory Board Member

Awards 
 2015: NATPE Brandon Tartikoff Legacy Award Recipient, with her father, Gustavo Cisneros

See also

 Colección Patricia Phelps de Cisneros
 List of Venezuelan Americans
 List of chief executive officers

References

Further reading

External links 

 
 Adriana Cisneros at Grupo Cisneros

American media executives
1979 births
Cisneros family
Columbia College (New York) alumni
New York University alumni
Living people
Place of birth missing (living people)
American women chief executives
American chief executives in the media industry
Deerfield Academy alumni
Venezuelan women journalists
Henry Crown Fellows
21st-century American women